Hason Raja (also known as Hason: The King) is a Bangladeshi Bengali film directed by Chashi Nazrul Islam and produced by actor Helal Khan. This film is based on the biography of poet and philosopher of Bangladesh Hason Raja This film was released in Bangladesh, the UK and the USA on 17 August 2002 and won National Film Awards in best film category and other six categories.

Plot

Cast
 Helal Khan - Hason Raja
 Shomi Kaiser - Binodini
 Mukti - Hason's Wife
 Bobita - Hason's Mother
 Shimla - Dancer
 Amol Bose
 Shanu
 Khurshiduzzaman Utpol
 Rebeka Moni

Soundtrack
The music of the film was directed by Shujeo Shyam and lyrics were penned by Arkum Shah, Kala Shah, Radha Romon, and Hason Raja. Subir Nandi, Shakila Jafar, Agun, Uma Khan, Polash, Bidit Lal Das sang in this film.

Awards

See also
 Matir Moyna

References

External links
 Hason Raja at the Bangla Movie Database

2002 films
2002 drama films
Bengali-language Bangladeshi films
Bangladeshi drama films
Films scored by Shujeo Shyam
2000s Bengali-language films
Films directed by Chashi Nazrul Islam
Best Film National Film Award (Bangladesh) winners